Henrique Ferreira (born 16 November 1960) is a Mozambican sprinter. He competed in the men's 200 metres at the 1984 Summer Olympics.

References

External links
 

1960 births
Living people
Athletes (track and field) at the 1984 Summer Olympics
Mozambican male sprinters
Olympic athletes of Mozambique
Place of birth missing (living people)